The Institute of Cryptography, Telecommunications and Computer Science or IKSI (ИКСИ) is a research institute within the Academy of the Federal Security Service of Russia, which trains specialists in areas such as the transfer, protection and processing of information. The key specialist training areas are cryptography, applied mathematics, information technology and digital technology, electrical engineering, radio technology and communications.

Prior to the dissolution of the Soviet Union, the Institute was known as The Technical Faculty of the KGB Higher School.

History
The institute began its history in 1949 when a resolution by the Politburo created the Higher School of Cryptographers, and a closed department was created under the Mechanics-Mathematics Faculty of Moscow State University by a resolution of the Council of Ministers of the USSR. Later they united to become the technical faculty of the Dzerzhinsky Higher School of the KGB.

The institute comprises faculties of applied mathematics, specialised engineering and information security, departments of natural science, special skills, and English language. The institute also runs an evening physics and maths school, an ex-budgetary Scientific Research Laboratory while the Academy has provision for post-graduate military courses, MA and PhD dissertation boards.

Specialties
Department of Applied Mathematics
Cryptography
Applied Mathematics and Computer Science Automation of information and analytical processes
Faculty of Special Technology Information, security telecommunications systems and electronic systems
Faculty of Information Security

Notable alumni

Eugene Kaspersky – cybersecurity expert

See also
FBI Academy
National Intelligence University
Mercyhurst University Institute for Intelligence Studies

References

External links
Institute of Cryptography, Telecommunications and Computer Science in the FSB Academy Official Website

Federal Security Service
Educational institutions established in 1949
Intelligence analysis
Intelligence education
Universities and institutes established in the Soviet Union
1949 establishments in the Soviet Union
KGB
Communications in the Soviet Union
Telecommunication education